Yok Siam Year 2 was a Thai quiz show television program. It encouraged Thai people in each province using their ability joyfully about knowledges and being proud in their hometown. It broadcast on Monday - Friday 6:30 - 6:55 p.m. on Modern Nine TV. It had begun airdate on January 12, 2009 before ended on February 25, 2010. It was produced by Workpoint Entertainment.

In addition, Maha Vajiralongkorn, Crown Prince of Thailand gave certificates with his signature to the province that is the winner.

Rules
In each team, there were 10 competitors with different jobs, and header of each team was well-known people in that province. Competitors of each team had to answer the questions about knownledges in Thailand, by choosing two choice, ก (A) or ข (B). Which team reaches three or five scores first, will be the winner.

Regional qualification

Eastern qualification
Note: red number with x means all competitors of each team answered wrong.

Participating teams
In the Eastern qualification, there were seven participating province teams, listed below.

First round
In the first round, there were seven provinces. One of them was given a bye to the second round.

Second round
In the second round, there were three provinces advancing from the first round. They played a round-robin tournament, in which each team is scheduled for two matches against other teams. This means that a total of three matches are played within a round. The top two teams advanced to the final.

Final

Northern qualification
Note: red number with x means all competitors of each team answered wrong.

Participating teams
In the Northern qualification, there were sixteen participating province teams, listed below.

Knockout stage

Southern qualification
Note: red number with x means all competitors of each team answered wrong.

Participating teams
In the Southern qualification, there were fourteen participating province teams, listed below.

Northeastern qualification
Note: red number with x means all competitors of each team answered wrong.

Central qualification
Note: red number with x means all competitors of each team answered wrong.

See also
 Yok Siam Year 1

References

Yok Siam
Y
Y
Y
Y
2000s Thai television series
2010s Thai television series
2009 Thai television seasons
2010 Thai television seasons